The World Allround Speed Skating Championships 1970 were held on 14 and 15 February in Oslo at the Bislett Stadium ice rink.

Title holder was the Norwegian Dag Fornæss.

Result

 * = Fell

Source:

References 

World Allround Speed Skating Championships, 1970
1970 World Allround